Such a Little Pirate is a lost 1918 American silent Pirate adventure film directed by George Melford and starring Lila Lee as a young sea-going heroine and Theodore Roberts as her grandfather. It was produced by Adolph Zukor and Jesse Lasky.

Cast

Lila Lee as Patricia Wolf
Theodore Roberts as Obadiah Wolf
Harrison Ford as Rory O'Malley
Guy Oliver as Bad-Eye
Forrest Seabury as Ellory Glendenning
J. Parks Jones as Harold Glendenning
Adele Farrington as Mrs. Glendenning

Reception
On Rotten Tomatoes, the film holds an approval rating of 80% based on 5 reviews, with an average rating of 0/10.

Joshua Lowe of Variety called Such a Little Pirate "a clean, wholesome, simple, straight-away tale".

The New York Times praised Theodore Roberts for his role as Obadiah Wolf, writing that the film "gains its chief merit".

References

External links

A scene in the film
Newspaper advert of the film

American silent feature films
Films directed by George Melford
Films based on short fiction
Lost American films
Paramount Pictures films
1918 adventure films
American black-and-white films
American adventure films
1918 lost films
Lost adventure films
Films based on works by James Oliver Curwood
1910s American films
Silent adventure films